Double Murder is a 1977 Italian giallo film directed by Steno.

Cast
 Marcello Mastroianni as Bruno Baldassarre
 Agostina Belli as Teresa Colasanti
 Ursula Andress as Princess Dell'Orso
 Peter Ustinov as Harry Hellman
 Jean-Claude Brialy as Van Nijlen
 Mario Scaccia as Marino Cianciarelli
 Gianfranco Barra as Cantalamessa
 Giuseppe Anatrelli as Carru
 Serge Frédéric as Melzio
 Jean-Patrick Junoy as Alex
 Luigi Zerbinati as The 'Debosciato', nephew of Prince Dell'Orso

References

External links

1977 films
Italian crime films
1970s Italian-language films
1977 crime films
Films directed by Stefano Vanzina
Films set in Rome
Films shot in Rome
Films scored by Riz Ortolani
Films with screenplays by Age & Scarpelli
1970s Italian films